I Had Trouble in Getting to Solla Sollew is a 1965 children's book by Dr. Seuss. The story features classic Seuss rhymes and drawings in his distinctive pen and ink style.

Plot
As the story opens, the protagonist lives a happy and carefree life before tripping over a rock one day and being bitten and stung by various creatures. A passing traveler says that he is bound for the trouble-free city of Solla Sollew, so the protagonist joins him. The journey itself is beset by many more troubles, including a draft animal that falls sick, a bus that breaks down, a flood, and a general who conscripts the protagonist into his army. The army retreats during battle, leaving the protagonist alone against a pack of wild Poozers. Escaping into a dark tunnel, the protagonist suffers numerous further mishaps before finally reaching an exit door that opens near Solla Sollew.

The protagonist discovers that Solla Sollew is surrounded by a wall with only one door. The doorman apologizes that he cannot open it, because a Key-Slapping Slippard recently nested in the key hole. Since the city no longer needs a doorman, he has decided to set off for yet another untroubled city that he has heard about. The protagonist declines to go with him and instead returns home, determined to face troubles rather than run away from them.

In Seussical
In Seussical, the character of General Genghis Kahn Schmitz makes an appearance as a secondary character. He introduces JoJo to the military school in song. This sets up a subplot concerning JoJo in which he is thought to be lost in battle. The character of Schmitz in the play is a cross between General Schmitz seen in the book and the unnamed generals in the Butter Battle Book.

Solla Sollew is the subject of a song in which the main characters yearn for a happy resolution to their problems. It is referred to as "a faraway land, so the stories all tell / somewhere beyond the horizon". It is said that "troubles there are few" and that "maybe it's something like heaven".

Solla Sollew is believed to be a place of hope and wonder, where "breezes are warm" and "people are kind". It is a dream of the characters to find this incredible place, where they will find each other and be happy once and for all. However, they cannot ever find it, saying in the song "when I get close, it disappears".

See also
 Bildungsroman

References

American picture books
Books by Dr. Seuss
1965 children's books
Random House books